The Museum of Korea Straw and Plants Handicraft is a handicrafts museum in Myeongnyun-dong, Jongno-gu, Seoul, South Korea.

History 
Museum of Korea Straw and Plants Handicraft was registered on Ministry of Culture and Tourism in 1993 and was located in Cheongdam-dong, Gangnam-gu, Seoul for 8 years. The museum was then relocated to Myeongnyun-dong in 2001. The founder is "Byung Sun In" who has devoted her whole life to research about handicraft with straw.

See also
List of museums in South Korea

External links
Official site

Museums in Seoul
Jongno District
Folk museums in South Korea
Korean handicrafts